is a professional Japanese baseball pitcher for the Chiba Lotte Marines of Nippon Professional Baseball (NPB). He previously played in NPB for the Hokkaido Nippon-Ham Fighters.

Career
On March 30, 2018, Nishimura made his Nippon Professional Baseball (NPB) debut for the Hokkaido Nippon-Ham Fighters.

On March 5, 2023, Nishimura was traded to the Chiba Lotte Marines in exchange for infielder Koki Fukuda.

References 

1993 births
Living people
Nippon Professional Baseball pitchers
Baseball people from Wakayama Prefecture
Hokkaido Nippon-Ham Fighters players